Happy New Year, America is an American television special that aired on the CBS television network to celebrate the New Year. It first aired on December 31, 1979 (leading into 1980), and last aired December 31, 1995 (leading into 1996).

The show was commissioned to replace Guy Lombardo's New Year specials. Though Lombardo had died in 1977, Guy's brother, Victor Lombardo, and their nephew Bill Lombardo, led the Royal Canadians band for two more New Year specials (1977 and 1978) after that. Happy New Year, America featured coverage of the Times Square Ball in New York City and the party in the ballroom of The Waldorf-Astoria Hotel, both of which were also covered during the Lombardo years. However, the show also featured pre-taped segments from Billy Bob's Texas (as made popular by CBS drama Dallas) and Walt Disney World.

The show had a different host year after year, unlike its competitor New Year's Rockin' Eve (which was annually hosted by Dick Clark). Andy Williams was the most frequent guest host of the show.  Other hosts include Paul Anka, who did the first one, Donny Osmond, Natalie Cole, Gladys Knight (1986–87; 1988–89) and Al Jarreau (who substituted for Knight when she was sick in the 1985–86 show), along with Kermit The Frog. Other people who have covered the countdown from Times Square include Catherine Bach (1979–80, 1980–81), Donna Mills, Michelle Lee, Jim Varney (in character as Ernest P. Worrell, 1988–89), Terry Bradshaw (1990–91), Brent Musburger (1986–87)' Christie Brinkley (1987–88), Natalie Cole and Lily Tomlin (in character as "Ernestine the Telephone Lady" 1984–85), having made appearances over the course of the show's run.

In 1991–92, CBS aired the Hard Rock Cafe New Year's Special, with Paul Reiser hosting from the New Orleans Hard Rock Cafe, with live performances by Bonnie Raitt, John Mellencamp, and pre-taped appearances by Sting, INXS, Dire Straits and the Neville Brothers. The special returned the following year, with Jay Thomas hosting from the New York Cafe and Nia Peeples reporting from Times Square. It featured appearances by Keith Richards, Robert Cray, Genesis, Pearl Jam, The B-52s, Bo Diddley, The Kids in the Hall, Judy Tenuta and U2.

The special went on hiatus for 1993–94; CBS instead aired a special edition of its recently-launched late-night talk show Late Show with David Letterman (competing with the traditional New Year's edition of The Tonight Show with Jay Leno on NBC), with guests Tom and Roseanne Arnold, Bon Jovi, and live coverage from Times Square. HNYA returned for 1994–95, this time with Letterman's bandleader Paul Shaffer as host. The following year, Montel Williams hosted what would be the final edition of the special. 

In 1996, Disney pulled out of producing the program (and several other CBS holiday specials) when it bought ABC, and CBS decided to discontinue its New Year's coverage. Since then, reruns of the Late Show have aired in the show's time slot, although a first-run episode, with live coverage of Times Square's countdown to midnight, aired on December 31, 1998. CBS aired a one-off America's Millennium special on December 31, 1999, which was hosted by Will Smith and Dan Rather and featured performances by Trisha Yearwood among others, and the premiere of The Unfinished Dream, a short film by Steven Spielberg.

On December 31, 2021, CBS aired a new New Year's Eve special, New Year's Eve Live: Nashville's Big Bash, from Nashville.  It was hosted by radio and TV personality Bobby Bones and co-hosted by Rachel Smith of Entertainment Tonight.  This marked the return of New Year's coverage to CBS after a 25-year absence.
 The special returned the following year, adding Times Square coverage anchored by CMT's Cody Alan and WCBS-TV weather anchor Lonnie Quinn.

References

New Year's television specials
1979 American television series debuts
1996 American television series endings
CBS original programming
1970s American television series
1980s American television series
1990s American television series
American annual television specials
Television shows filmed in New York City